Aranyik is a sub-district in the Mueang Phitsanulok District of Phitsanulok Province, Thailand.

Geography
Aranyik lies in the Nan Basin, which is part of the Chao Phraya Watershed. It is between three separate rivers.

Administration
The following is a list of the sub-district's muban, which roughly correspond to villages:

Temples
Wat Sra Mai Daeng
Wat Kuean Kan
Wat Thep Gunchon Bam Rung Tam
Wat Sra Siliam in Ban Khlong Mahat Thai

References

Tambon of Phitsanulok province
Populated places in Phitsanulok province